Michael O'Halloran is a 1937 American drama film directed by Karl Brown and starring Wynne Gibson, Warren Hull and Jackie Moran. It is an adaptation of the 1915 novel of the same name by Gene Stratton-Porter.

Cast

 Wynne Gibson as Grace Mintum  
 Warren Hull as Dr. Douglas Bruce  
 Jackie Moran as Michael O'Halloran 
 Charlene Wyatt as Lily O'Halloran  
 Sidney Blackmer as Jim Mintum  
 Irene Manning as Leslie 
 G. P. Huntley as Ted Frost 
 Robert Greig as Craig, the Butler  
 Helen Lowell as Hettie  
 Vera Gordon as Mrs. Levinsky  
 Pierre Watkin as Mark Grave 
 Dorothy Vaughan as Mrs. Tolliver  
 Bodil Rosing as Mrs. Polska  
 Guy Usher as Judge H.J. Benson 
 Edgar Allen as Reporter  
 Richard Beach as Eddie  
 Anne Bennett as Mary Jones  
 Doris Bren as Nina Polska  
 Lynn Browning as Friend 
 Sonny Bupp as Sarge 
 Horace B. Carpenter as Skipper 
 Nell Craig as Reporter  
 Walter Dennis as Snowball  
 Barry Downing as Malcolm Minturn 
 Winifred Drew as Friend  
 Jay Eaton as Friend 
 Bill Elliott as Little Lord Fauntleroy  
 Fern Emmett as Ella  
 Donald Kerr as Reporter  
 Leonard Kibrick as Benny Levinsky  
 Jack Leppert as Butch 
 Vince Lombardi as Tony Dominic  
 Roger McGee as Fat Tolliver 
 Shirley McGee as Sally Tolliver 
 Harold Miller as Friend  
 Nellie V. Nichols as Mrs. Dominic  
 Paddy O'Flynn as Elevator Starter 
 Alexander Pollard as Footman  
 Ben Taggart as Officer Reardon  
 Carol Tevis as Mary Jane  
 Audrey Halligan
 June Parkes
 Ronald Hughson
 Carleton Young

References

Bibliography
 Elizabeth Leese. Costume Design in the Movies: An Illustrated Guide to the Work of 157 Great Designers. Courier Corporation, 2012.

External links
 

1937 films
1937 drama films
American drama films
Republic Pictures films
American black-and-white films
Films based on American novels
Remakes of American films
Sound film remakes of silent films
Films based on works by Gene Stratton-Porter
1930s English-language films
1930s American films